Metropolitan (French: Métropolitain) is a 1939 French thriller film directed by Maurice Cam and starring Albert Préjean, Ginette Leclerc and André Brulé. The film was remade in Britain the following year as A Window in London with the setting moved to the London Underground.

Synopsis
While travelling on the Paris Métro, a man spots what looks like a murder being committed.

Cast
 Albert Préjean as Pierre 
 Ginette Leclerc as Viviane  
 André Brulé as Zoltini 
 Anne Laurens as Suzanne 
 Albert Duvaleix 
 Maxime Fabert
 Pierre Sergeol
 Paul Demange
 Georgette Tissier
 Yvonne Yma

References

Bibliography
 Hodgson, Michael. Patricia Roc. Author House, 2013.

External links 

1939 films
French thriller films
1930s thriller films
Films directed by Maurice Cam
Films set in Paris
French black-and-white films
1930s English-language films
1930s French films